The 1881 Mississippi gubernatorial election took place on November 8, 1881, in order to elect the Governor of Mississippi. Incumbent Governor John M. Stone ran for reelection to a second full term, but lost the Democratic nomination to Robert Lowry.

General election
In the general election, Democratic candidate Robert Lowry defeated Benjamin King. The election was marred by massive fraud, and would mark the last time until 1975 in which a non-Democrat received more than 40% of the vote.

Results

References

1881
gubernatorial
Mississippi
November 1881 events